A ramen shop is a restaurant that specializes in ramen dishes, the wheat-flour Japanese noodles in broth. In Japan, ramen shops are very common and popular, and are sometimes referred to as ramen-ya  or ramen-ten . Some ramen shops operate in short order style, while others provide patrons with sit-down service. Over 10,000 ramen shops exist in Japan. In recent times, ramen shops have burgeoned in some cities in the United States, such as Chicago, Los Angeles, and New York City.

Overview

A ramen shop typically specializes in ramen dishes, and may provide other foods such as gyōza. In Japan, ramen shops are sometimes referred to as ramen-ya or ramen-ten. Some ramen shops prepare all of their foods in-house "from scratch", including the soups, broths and ramen noodles, while others use prepackaged prepared noodles and other prepared ingredients. As of 2016, over 10,000 ramen shops exist in Japan.

Ramen dishes are very popular in Japan and are a significant part of Japanese cuisine, and ramen shops are very common and popular throughout the country. In Japan, television shows devoted to ramen shops, their fare, finding the best shops, and local specialties are popular. In the 1990s in Japan, corporate restructuring led to increased employment layoffs and cuts, and during this time articles were published in various magazines about starting up a ramen shop as a means to generate income and become a self-employed entrepreneur in attempts to offset the job layoffs and cuts.

In the United States, ramen shops exist in several cities and states, and in recent times have burgeoned in cities such as New York City, Chicago and Los Angeles.

Japanese ramen shops specialize in ramen dishes and exist throughout Japan. Many ramen restaurants have limited seating, and some only have a bar with stools for patrons to eat at. At some ramen establishments, patrons place their order and remit payment at a ticket machine located in front of the shop, and then wait in line for their food. When a seat becomes available, patrons give the server their ticket and then wait for their food. This system can serve to keep the line moving in an expedient manner. Other ramen shops provide sit-down service whereby patrons are provided with a menu and order fare from a server.

Notable ramen shops

The following is a list of notable ramen shops and restaurants.
 Ajisen Ramen – a Japanese restaurant chain of fast food restaurants selling Japanese ramen dishes, it has over 700 stores
 Boxer Ramen, Portland, Oregon, U.S.
  – a Japanese ramen restaurant chain
 Ichiran is a Japanese restaurant chain that originated and is based in Fukuoka. The chain specifically specializes upon tonkotsu ramen.
 Ippudo – a Japanese ramen restaurant chain that is well known for its tonkotsu ramen, it has been described as "the most famous tonkotsu ramen shop in the country".
 Ivan Ramen – a ramen restaurant with two locations in New York City
 Jinya Ramen Bar – a restaurant chain based in Los Angeles, California
 Muteppou – a Japanese ramen noodle restaurant chain
 Ramen Jiro – a Japanese ramen restaurant chain
 Ramen Street – an area in the underground mall of the Tokyo Station railway station's Yaesu side that has eight restaurants specializing in ramen dishes.
 Tenkaippin – a Japanese restaurant chain specializing in ramen noodles
 Yume Wo Katare – a ramen shop in Cambridge, Massachusetts where diners are encouraged to share their dreams and aspirations to their fellow diners after finishing their meal

In popular culture

 The Japanese film Tampopo involves a premise of the characters encountering difficulties in attempts to create the best noodle shop in Japan.
 The film Blade Runner has scenes where the main character is served ramen at an outdoor sit-down shop in futuristic Los Angeles.
 In the Naruto manga and anime series, a prominent ramen shop called Ichiraku Ramen—based on a real-life ramen restaurant—is the favourite dining establishment of main character Naruto Uzumaki.
 In the video game Persona 5, the protagonist is introduced to a famous ramen shop in Ogikubo by his best friend, which he can visit along with other friends.
 In the Kaguya-sama: Love is War anime and manga, major character Chika Fujiwara is shown to be a ramen connoisseur who frequents ramen shops in the Tokyo area, attempting to find the optimum combination of broth and noodles.

See also

 Izakaya – a Japanese gastropub
 List of noodle restaurants
 List of Japanese restaurants
 Momofuku Ando Instant Ramen Museum
 Noodle soup
 Shin-Yokohama Rāmen Museum
 Yatai – food stalls in Japan that typically purvey ramen and other foods

Notes

References

External links
 

 
Japanese inventions
Japanese restaurants
Restaurants by type